Camberwell railway station is the junction for the Lilydale, Belgrave and Alamein lines in Victoria, Australia. It serves the eastern Melbourne suburb of Camberwell, and it opened on 3 April 1882.

History

Camberwell station opened on 3 April 1882, when the line was extended from Hawthorn. It remained the terminus of the line for a few months in that year, until the railway was extended to Lilydale. When the first section of the Outer Circle line opened in 1891, a new station was built at East Camberwell, to provide an interchange. However, the Outer Circle line quickly failed. By 1898, only the section from East Camberwell to Ashburton remained in operation (later extended to Alamein in 1948), and services for Ashburton began to depart from Camberwell.

In the late 1910s, the line from Hawthorn to Camberwell was regraded, to ease the steep gradient facing Down services. Steam locomotives could not pull a fully laden train between the two stations, so peak-hour services had to be split. The locomotive would bring one set of carriages to Camberwell, then return for the other set, causing significant delays. With the regrading, the tracks at Camberwell were sunk into a cutting and the existing station was demolished. In 1919, the current Federation-style station buildings opened, when the works were completed.

Immediately east of the station, the Alamein line diverges south, with a flyover carrying the southbound line over the Lilydale and Belgrave lines. This flyover was provided in 1959, when the line was duplicated to Riversdale. In 1963, a third line was provided between Hawthorn and Camberwell and, in 1964, the third line was extended to East Camberwell. Also in November of that year, the signal box at Camberwell was the first in Victoria to have push-button signalling installed. In 1972, the centre track was extended to East Camberwell and, in 1974, the platforms were renumbered to their current arrangement.

At around 7:20am on 9 August 1975, a Tait train set rolled away from the station prior to operating an Alamein service. It occurred after the driver and guard left the train and went into the station building. It reached speeds of up to 30kph before it slowed to walking speed near Flinders Street, allowing a driver's supervisor to jump aboard and stop the train. No passengers were onboard at the time.

On 27 April 1996, Camberwell was upgraded to a Premium Station. In 1997, four stabling sidings were built on the site of the former goods yard, to replace sidings that were removed at Jolimont Yard. The stabling sidings had been first proposed by the Metropolitan Transit Authority (The Met) in the mid-1980s.

Redevelopment controversy
In 2001, the Victorian State Government launched a new Metropolitan Planning Strategy, Melbourne 2030, which proposed intensification of development around public transport nodes, such as railway stations and tram routes, along with limits on such development in residential neighbourhoods. The precinct around the station was identified as one of a number of 'activity centres' earmarked for redevelopment.

In March 2003, VicTrack announced plans to develop the airspace over the site, including the construction of a deck over the station platforms and adjacent stabling yard, with 3–4 levels of car park, and 3–4 storeys of commercial space. The original plans, involving the station's demolition, led to protests from the local community. They received a significant amount of media attention, with actor Geoffrey Rush and comedian Barry Humphries publicly backing the campaign, and heading a protest march up Burke Road from Camberwell Junction to the station. The comedian performed a poem about planners at the rally, and noted that the railway line was sometimes called 'The Orient Express'. To those supporting development of the station, the actions of the protesters were seen as an example of NIMBYism.

The Boroondara Residents Action Group worked with architects McGauran Giannini Soon to provide alternative ideas for developing the air-space over the station and yard that were more in-keeping with their view of community preferences, including a small public plaza and a new public library, with some small-scale shops.

Although the station is historic, it is not protected by any of the state's heritage listings for any architectural or cultural reasons, and failed to gain that protection when nominated to the Victorian Heritage Register by local residents groups.

In July 2009, the Victorian Civil and Administrative Tribunal approved a nine-storey development on the site, provided that 14 design modifications were made within 28 days.

In October 2012, VicTrack announced that it had discontinued negotiations with the preferred developer, CSTP Pty Ltd.

Platforms and services

Camberwell has one island platform with two faces and one side platform. It is serviced by Metro Trains' Lilydale, Belgrave and Alamein line services.

Platform 1:
  all stations and limited express services to Flinders Street
  all stations and limited express services to Flinders Street
  weekday all stations and limited express services to Flinders Street; all stations shuttle services to Alamein

Platform 2:
  all stations and limited express services to Flinders Street; all stations and limited express services to Belgrave
  all stations and limited express services to Flinders Street; all stations and limited express services to Lilydale
  terminating services from Alamein

Platform 3:
  all stations and limited express services to Belgrave; weekday all stations and limited express services to Blackburn
  all stations and limited express services to Lilydale; weekday all stations and limited express services to Blackburn
  all stations shuttle services to Alamein

Transport links

CDC Melbourne operates one route via Camberwell station, under contract to Public Transport Victoria:
 : Box Hill station – Chadstone Shopping Centre

Kinetic Melbourne operates one route via Camberwell station, under contract to Public Transport Victoria:
 : Doncaster Park and Ride – Camberwell Shopping Centre

Yarra Trams operates one route via Camberwell station:
 : Melbourne University – Camberwell

References

External links

  Birrell, B. and O'Connor, K. – 2030: a space fallacy – plans to end the urban sprawl will destroy the character of Melbourne, Opinion piece in The Age
  Dovey, K et al. (2005) What is Urban Character? The case of Camberwell, Proceedings, 2nd State of Australian Cities Conference, Brisbane: Griffith University
 Melway map at street-directory.com.au

Premium Melbourne railway stations
Railway stations in Australia opened in 1882
Railway stations in Melbourne
Railway stations in the City of Boroondara